Marcel Granollers was the defending champion but chose not to defend his title.

James Duckworth won the title after defeating Alejandro Davidovich Fokina 6–4, 6–3 in the final.

Seeds
All seeds receive a bye into the second round.

Draw

Finals

Top half

Section 1

Section 2

Bottom half

Section 3

Section 4

References
Main Draw
Qualifying Draw

Singles